The Battle is a 1911 American war film directed by  D. W. Griffith. The film was set during the American Civil War. It was shot in Fort Lee, New Jersey, where  many early film studios in America's first motion picture industry were based at the beginning of the 20th century. Prints of the film survive in several film archives around the world including the Museum of Modern Art, UCLA Film and Television Archive, George Eastman House and the Filmoteca Española.

Cast

 Charles West - The Boy (as Charles H. West)
 Blanche Sweet - The Boy's Sweetheart
 Charles Hill Mailes - The Union Commander
 Robert Harron - A Union soldier
 Donald Crisp - A Union Soldier
 Spottiswoode Aitken
 Edwin August - A Union Officer
 Lionel Barrymore - Wagon Driver
 Kate Bruce - In the Town
 William J. Butler - A Union Officer/At Farewell
 W. Christy Cabanne - A Union Soldier
Edna Foster - At Dance
 Joseph Graybill - A Union Officer
 Guy Hedlund - A Union Soldier
 Dell Henderson - A Union Officer
 Harry Hyde - A Union Soldier
 J. Jiquel Lanoe - A Union Officer
 W. Chrystie Miller - At Dance
 Alfred Paget - Confederate Officer
 W. C. Robinson - A Union Soldier
 Kate Toncray - At Dance/At Farewell

See also
 D. W. Griffith filmography
 Blanche Sweet filmography
 Lionel Barrymore filmography

References

External links

1911 films
1911 short films
1911 war films
Films directed by D. W. Griffith
American silent short films
Biograph Company films
American black-and-white films
American Civil War films
Films shot in Fort Lee, New Jersey
American war films
1910s American films